William Mahony may refer to:

 William Mahony (politician, born 1877) (1877–1962), member of the Australian House of Representatives, 1915–1927
 William Mahony (New South Wales politician) (1856–1918), member of the New South Wales Legislative Assembly, 1894–1910
 William Mahony (bishop) (1919–1994), Bishop of the Roman Catholic Diocese of Ilorin
 Bill Mahony (William Victor Mahony, born 1949), Canadian Olympic swimmer

See also
William Mahoney (disambiguation)